This is a list of Robot Wars robots from outside Great Britain that competed in the series, thus including the US, German and Dutch versions.

The second foreign robot to win a title in the UK series was Diotoir from Ireland, the most successful Irish robot, who won Tag Team Terror with Pussycat in Extreme 1. Ironically, all the World Championships have also been won by British robots, despite the competition being available to robots worldwide.

Robots

References

External links

Robot Wars (TV series)